Driveblind formed in Aberdeen in Scotland in 2001. Originally a two-piece singer-songwriter partnership comprising Nick Tyler and Terry McDermott, they recorded a few songs on cassette, later recruiting other band members to complete the band.

After quickly establishing themselves on their local music scene, they played several well-attended shows in Aberdeen before then heading across the Atlantic Ocean to perform shows in New York City and Los Angeles. A weekend of gigs at the Viper Room in Hollywood, California led to them being noticed by music industry representatives.

They released their debut album on 24 October 2006, via Geffen Records. This band is no longer active since 2008/2009.

Discography

2006: Driveblind
2008: The Future You Were Promised EP

After Driveblind
After Driveblind, Terry McDermott left to the United States where he resided and married continuing his musical career in the States. He went on to form Lotus Crush with Candlebox members Peter Klett and Scott Mercado and MIGGS member John Luzzi in 2009. Lotus Crush released its debut record Half Light Morning on 3 March 2011.

On 1 August 2012, it was announced that Terry McDermott had auditioned for Season 3 of the NBC television show The Voice becoming part of Team Blake.
On 18 December 2012 Terry was named runner-up on The Voice.  He was beat by Cassadee Pope.

External links
 Driveblind's official website
 Driveblind's official MySpace page
 Driveblind Official RSS Feed
 Driveblind at rehearsals.com

Musical groups established in 2000
Scottish rock music groups